The Aviation Traders ATL-90 Accountant was a 1950s British twin-engined 28-passenger turboprop airliner built at Southend Airport England by Aviation Traders, a member of the airline and aircraft engineering group controlled by Freddie Laker.

History
The ATL-90 Accountant was a turboprop airliner designed as a replacement for the Douglas DC-3. It was powered by two Rolls-Royce Dart turboprops and first flew from Southend on 9 July 1957. The only Accountant, initially flown using the test serial G-41-1, but quickly registered G-ATEL, was displayed at the Farnborough Airshow in September 1957 but did not attract much commercial interest. The aircraft last flew on 10 January 1958, development was abandoned and the aircraft was scrapped in February 1960.

Specifications (Accountant I)

See also

Notes

Bibliography
 
 
 
 

Accountant
1950s British airliners
Low-wing aircraft
Twin-turboprop tractor aircraft
Aircraft first flown in 1957